The Tielt Formation (abbreviation: Tt; named after the town of Tielt in West Flanders) is a geologic formation in the subsurface of Belgium. The formation crops out in the north of Hainaut, in the southern and central parts of West- and East Flanders and in Walloon and Flemish Brabant. It consists of marine very fine sand and silt, deposited in the shallow sea that covered Belgium during the middle and late Ypresian age (early Eocene, about 53 million years ago).

Description 
It is subdivided into two members: the Kortemark and Egemkapel Members. The formation lies stratigraphically on top of the Kortrijk Formation (early Ypresian sandy clay and silt). In the northwestern part of Belgium, the Gentbrugge Formation (late Ypresian marine clay and silt) covers the Tielt Formation. If the Gentbrugge Formation is absent, the younger Brussel Formation (Lutetian calcareous sand) is directly found on top of the Tielt Formation.

Fossil content

Chondrichthyes

Crustaceans

See also 
 List of fossiliferous stratigraphic units in Belgium
 Ypresian formations
 Fur Formation of Denmark
 London Clay Formation of England
 Silveirinha Formation of Portugal
 Wasatchian formations
 Nanjemoy Formation of the eastern United States
 Wasatch Formation of the western United States
 Itaboraian formations
 Itaboraí Formation of Brazil
 Laguna del Hunco Formation of Argentina

References

Bibliography 

 
 
 

Geologic formations of Belgium
Eocene Series of Europe
Paleogene Belgium
Ypresian Stage
Sandstone formations
Shallow marine deposits
Formations
Formations
Formations
Formations
Formations